Suzaki (written: 須崎 or 洲崎) is a Japanese surname. Notable people with the surname include:

, a Japanese voice actress
, a Japanese footballer
, a Japanese pair skater and Olympian

See also
Suzaki Station, a train station in Nishinomiya, Hyōgo Prefecture, Japan
Suzaki Imperial Villa, a residence in Shimoda, Shizuoka Prefecture, Japan owned by the Japanese imperial family

Japanese-language surnames